Nedra Tyre (October 6, 1912 – 1990) was an American social worker and author, specializing in crime fiction.

A native of Offerman, Georgia, Tyre attended Emory University and the Richmond School of Social Work. She had professional stints as a librarian, clerk, and advertising copy writer, in addition to her fiction and social work. Her book reviews appeared in The Richmond News Leader and The Atlanta Journal.

Tyre died in Richmond, Virginia in 1990.

Selected bibliography
 Mouse in Eternity (Knopf, 1952)
 Death of an Intruder (Knopf, 1953)
 Journey to Nowhere (Knopf, 1954)
 Hall of Death (Simon and Schuster, 1960)
 Everyone Suspect (Macmillan, 1964)
 Twice So Fair (Random House, 1971)

References

1912 births
1990 deaths
People from Pierce County, Georgia
Emory University alumni
Novelists from Georgia (U.S. state)
American crime fiction writers
American women novelists
20th-century American novelists
20th-century American women writers
Women crime fiction writers